2325 Chernykh, provisional designation , is a dark Themistian asteroid from the outer regions of the asteroid belt, approximately  in diameter. It was discovered on 25 September 1979, by Czech astronomer Antonín Mrkos at the Klet Observatory in the Czech Republic. The asteroid was named after Russian astronomer couple Lyudmila Chernykh and Nikolai Chernykh.

Orbit and classification 

Chernykh is a Themistian asteroid that belongs to the Themis family, a very large family of carbonaceous asteroids, named after 24 Themis. It orbits the Sun in the outer main-belt at a distance of 2.6–3.7 AU once every 5 years and 7 months (2,031 days; semi-major axis of 3.14 AU). Its orbit has an eccentricity of 0.18 and an inclination of 2° with respect to the ecliptic. The body's observation arc begins with its first precovery observation at Palomar Observatory in May 1955.

Physical characteristics 

Although the asteroid's spectral type is unknown, its albedo indicates a carbonaceous composition, which also agrees with C-type classification for the Themistian asteroids.

According to the survey carried out by the NEOWISE mission of NASA's Wide-field Infrared Survey Explorer, Chernykh measures 22.789 kilometers in diameter and its surface has an albedo of 0.065. As of 2018, no rotational lightcurve of Chernykh has been obtained from photometric observations. The body's rotation period, pole and shape remain unknown.

Naming 

This minor planet was named after the Russian astronomers Lyudmila Chernykh (1935–2017) and Nikolai Chernykh (1931–2004), prolific discoverers of minor planets who lead the extensive astrometric program at the discovering Crimean Astrophysical Observatory. The official naming citation was published by the Minor Planet Center on 1 June 1981.

References

External links 
 Asteroid Lightcurve Database (LCDB), query form (info )
 Dictionary of Minor Planet Names, Google books
 Asteroids and comets rotation curves, CdR – Observatoire de Genève, Raoul Behrend
 Discovery Circumstances: Numbered Minor Planets (1)-(5000) – Minor Planet Center
 
 

002325
Discoveries by Antonín Mrkos
Named minor planets
19790925